Xianshou is a genus of gliding haramiyidan synapsid known from the Oxfordian stage of the Jurassic period, approximately 160 million years ago. Two species, X. linglong and X. songae, are known from fossils of the Tiaojishan Formation in the Liaoning province of China.

Etymology
The genus name is derived from Chinese xiān (仙), meaning "immortal" or "celestial being", and shòu (獸), meaning "creature" or "beast".  The specific name linglong is derived from both the Chinese word for "exquisite" (玲瓏), and from the name of the town Linglongta, where the holotype was discovered. X. songae is named for the collector of the specimen, Rufeng Song.

Description 
X. linglong is believed to have weighed 83 grams (2.9 oz) in life. It can be distinguished from X. songae and Shenshou by the sharper cusps and ridges of its upper molars, and by larger size. X. songae is estimated to have weighed around 40 grams (1.4 oz)

More recent study of Xianshou suggests that, like the closely related Maiopatagium and Vilevolodon, it may have had a patagia and the ability to glide. No patagium is preserved in Xianshou fossils, but the morphology of the limbs and pes is most similar to those of extant gliding mammals.

Phylogeny
The following phylogenetic analysis was recovered by the description of Xianshou.

References

Euharamiyids
Prehistoric cynodont genera
Oxfordian life
Late Jurassic synapsids of Asia
Jurassic China
Fossils of China
Fossil taxa described in 2014
Taxa named by Shundong Bi
Taxa named by Yuanqing Wang
Taxa named by Jian Guan
Taxa named by Xia Sheng
Taxa named by Jin Meng